David Walter Sparks (April 28, 1928 – December 5, 1954) was an American football player. He played professionally as a guard and tackle in the National Football League (NFL) with the San Francisco 49ers in 1951 and the Washington Redskins in 1954. Sparks played college football at the University of North Carolina and was selected in the 15th round of the 1951 NFL Draft by the 49ers.

Sparks died from a coronary thrombosis on December 5, 1954, at a friend's home in Arlington, Virginia just hours after playing for the Redskins against the Cleveland Browns.

References

External links
 

1928 births
1954 deaths
American football guards
American football tackles
South Carolina Gamecocks football players
San Francisco 49ers players
Washington Redskins players
Sportspeople from Lorain, Ohio
Players of American football from Ohio